The following is a list of ecoregions in Norway.

Mainland Norway
The ecoregions of mainland Norway are as follows:

Taiga
Scandinavian and Russian taiga

Temperate coniferous forests
Scandinavian coastal conifer forests

Temperate broadleaf and mixed forests
Sarmatic mixed forests

Tundra
Kola Peninsula tundra
Scandinavian montane birch forest and grasslands

Svalbard
The ecoregions of Svalbard are as follows:

Tundra
Arctic desert

References

Ecoregions of Norway
Norway geography-related lists
Climate of Norway